KOTO (91.7 FM) is a National Public Radio-affiliated radio station licensed to Telluride, Colorado, United States.  The station is currently owned by San Miguel Educational Fund.

Translators
In addition to the main station, KOTO is relayed by an additional four translators to widen its broadcast area.

See also
List of community radio stations in the United States

References

External links
 KOTO official website
 

KOTO
Community radio stations in the United States
OTO